Saparevo  is a village in Sapareva Banya Municipality, Kyustendil Province, Bulgaria, near Sapareva Banya
.

References

Villages in Kyustendil Province